Jaroda is a large village located in the district of Muzaffarnagar in the state of Uttar Pradesh in India.

Per 2011 census of India, It has a population of about 11,708 persons living in around 1965 households. The majority of the population belong to the Hindu. People of Sharawat, Dahiya, and Goliyan gotra Jat lives in Jaroda. Before independence Jaroda was under the Zamindari of Nawaab Liaquat Ali Khan who was the first Prime Minister of Pakistan. And 
Choudhary Mool singh Sharawat or Moola Munshi of Sharawat Gotra Jat who belongs to Jaroda was the Accountant or Munshi of Nawaab Liyaquat Ali Khan. People of Sharawat Gotra Jat Of Jaroda belongs to Mehrauli, Delhi.

Villages nearby include Nara (2.3 km), Molaheri (2.5 km), Wahalna (2.9 km), Lachhera (3.2 km), Seemli (3.7 km), Mirapur (4.1 km), and Sujru (4.7 km).

References 

Villages in Muzaffarnagar district